The Grand Canyon (Hebrew: גרנד קניון, literally "Grand Mall," a play on words with the actual Grand Canyon) is the largest shopping mall in northern Israel, located in the northern city of Haifa.

It features 220 stores, of which approximately 80% are chain stores. Inside the mall there is also a  spa, and a children's amusement park which closed in April 2014.

The mall opens half an hour after sunset on Saturday out of respect for the Jewish Sabbath. However, some stores and restaurants are open on Saturdays.

References

See also
List of shopping malls in Israel
Lev HaMifratz Mall

Buildings and structures in Haifa
Shopping malls in Israel
Shopping malls established in 1999
Tourist attractions in Haifa
1999 establishments in Israel